The Innovation, Universities, Science and Skills Select Committee was a select committee of the House of Commons in the Parliament of the United Kingdom. The remit of the Committee was to examine the expenditure, administration and policy of the Department for Innovation, Universities and Skills, any associated public bodies and the government office for science.

The committee was dissolved on 30 September 2009 and replaced by the Business, Innovation and Skills Select Committee following the merging of the Department for Innovation, Universities and Skills into the new Department for Business, Innovation and Skills. The committee was officially replaced by the Science and Technology Select Committee, which was re-established on 1 October 2009 and is made up of the same membership as the old Innovation, Universities, Science and Skills select committee.

Membership
The membership of the committee at its time of dissolution were:

Source: Parliament Website

See also
List of Committees of the United Kingdom Parliament

References

External links
 Records for this Committee are held at the Parliamentary Archives
 Innovation, Universities, Science and Skills Committee

Defunct Select Committees of the British House of Commons